Adriu Delai (born June 11, 1984) is a Fijian Rugby union player. He is a an international and has played for several French clubs in the Pro D2 and Fédérale 1. In 2016 he played against Georgia in a test match for their 2016 mid-year tour. He was selected to play in the 2016 Pacific Nations Cup.

Honours & achievements

Biarritz
Rugby Pro D2 top try scorer: 2017–18 (15 tries)

References

External links 
 ESPN Scrum Profile

Fiji international rugby union players
Fijian rugby union players
1984 births
Living people
Rugby union centres
Rugby union wings
Pacific Islanders rugby union players
I-Taukei Fijian people
Fijian people of I-Taukei Fijian descent
Place of birth missing (living people)